Monica Andersson (born 3 September 1953) is a Swedish orienteering competitor. She is Relay World Champion from 1974, as a member of the Swedish winning team (with Birgitta Larsson and Kristin Cullman). At the 1979 World Championships she won an individual bronze medal as well as a bronze medal in the relay (with Anna-Lena Axelsson and Karin Rabe).

References

Living people
Swedish orienteers
Female orienteers
Foot orienteers
World Orienteering Championships medalists
1953 births
20th-century Swedish women